McAlary is a surname. Notable people with this surname include:

Max McAlary (born 1929), Australian wrestler
Mike McAlary (1957–1998), American journalist
Shirley McAlary, Canadian politician

See also
McClary